Strikeforce: Marquardt vs. Saffiedine was the final mixed martial arts event held by Strikeforce. The event took place on January 12, 2013 at the Chesapeake Energy Arena in Oklahoma City, Oklahoma. The event aired live on Showtime.

Background
This was the final event for Strikeforce before the organization was folded and merged with the UFC.

Luke Rockhold was scheduled to defend his Strikeforce Middleweight Championship for the last time against Lorenz Larkin at this event, but was forced off the card due to injuries. Larkin was instead matched up with former champion Ronaldo Souza in late November, but on December 20, it was announced that UFC middleweight Ed Herman would be facing Souza instead, making him the only person to cross over to fight in Strikeforce while still under a UFC contract.

Gilbert Melendez was scheduled to defend his Strikeforce Lightweight Championship at this event against Pat Healy, but he too was forced out of the bout with an injury. Instead, Healy was matched up with Jorge Masvidal, but after Masvidal suffered a back injury, he was replaced in the Healy bout with promotional newcomer Kurt Holobaugh. The Healy/Masvidal fight would later be rescheduled for UFC on FOX 11 in April 2014, over a year after their move to the UFC after the Strikeforce merger, where Masvidal won via unanimous decision.

AXS TV personality and Inside MMA reporter Ron Kruck handled commentary at this event in place of Mauro Ranallo, who was absent due to a private family matter. Kruck had previously done backstage interviews for Strikeforce preliminary cards broadcast on AXS TV when it was still known as HDNet.

Results

Reported payout
The following is the reported payout to the fighters as reported to the Oklahoma State Athletic Commission. It does not include sponsor money or any other bonuses.
 Tarec Saffiedine: $39,000 (includes $19,500 win bonus) def. Nate Marquardt: $40,000
 Daniel Cormier: $120,000 (includes $60,000 win bonus) def. Dion Staring: $8,000
 Josh Barnett : $250,000 (no win bonus) def. Nandor Guelmino: $12,000
 Gegard Mousasi: $175,000 (no win bonus) def. Mike Kyle: $25,000
 Ronaldo Souza: $100,500 (includes $28,000 win bonus) def.  Ed Herman: $34,000
 Ryan Couture : $22,000 (includes $7,000 win bonus) def. K. J. Noons: $41,000
 Tim Kennedy : $80,000 (includes $25,000 win bonus) def. Trevor Smith: $8,000
 Pat Healy: $42,000 (includes $15,000 win bonus) def. Kurt Holobaugh: $9,000
 Roger Gracie: $94,000 (includes $47,000 win bonus) def. Anthony Smith: $10,000
 Adriano Martins : $16,000 (includes $8,000 win bonus) def. Jorge Gurgel: $10,000
 Estevan Payan : $12,000 (includes $6,000 win bonus) def. Michael Bravo: $6,000

References

Marquardt vs. Saffiedine
2013 in mixed martial arts
Mixed martial arts in Oklahoma
Sports in Oklahoma City
2013 in sports in Oklahoma